The 5th Delaware Infantry Regiment was an infantry regiment in the Union Army during the American Civil War.

Service
The 5th Delaware Infantry Regiment was organized October 25, 1862 and mustered in November 26, 1862.

The regiment was attached to District of Delaware, VIII Corps, Middle Department, to July 1863. 2nd Separate Brigade, VIII Corps, Middle Department, to August.

The 5th Delaware Infantry mustered out of service August 12, 1863.

Detailed service
Duty in Delaware and as garrison at Fort Delaware, and guard duty on line of the Philadelphia, Wilmington & Baltimore Railroad from Perryville to Baltimore, until August 1863.

Casualties
The regiment lost a total of 3 enlisted men during service, all due to disease.

Notable members
 Captain Lammot du Pont I, Company B - chemist and a key member of the du Pont family and its company

See also

 List of Delaware Civil War units
 Delaware in the Civil War

References
 Dyer, Frederick H. A Compendium of the War of the Rebellion (Des Moines, IA: Dyer Pub. Co.), 1908.
Attribution
 

Military units and formations established in 1862
Military units and formations disestablished in 1863
Units and formations of the Union Army from Delaware
1862 establishments in Delaware